José Pedro Alves Salazar (born 18 October 1978), known as José Pedro or Zé Pedro, is a Portuguese former footballer who played as an attacking midfielder.

He amassed Primeira Liga totals of 210 matches and 32 goals over ten seasons, mainly with Belenenses and Vitória de Setúbal. He also represented in the competition Boavista, in a 17-year professional career.

Playing career
Born in Montijo, Setúbal, José Pedro started playing professional football for his hometown club C.D. Montijo in 1996, then moved to F.C. Barreirense where he would remain for the following five seasons, all spent in the third division. He split duties in 2002–03 between Boavista F.C. and A.D. Ovarense.

Zé Pedro was influential in Vitória FC's 2003–04 campaign, as the Setúbal-based team earned a Primeira Liga return. He subsequently joined C.F. Os Belenenses, where he was immediately cast into the starting XI.

In 2006–07, José Pedro scored eight league goals for a Belenenses final fifth-place in the league (with qualification for the UEFA Cup), while they were also runners-up in the domestic cup. He repeated the individual feat the following season, and remained first choice until the 2009–10 campaign, when he dealt with many injuries and the Lisbon side were also relegated as second-bottom.

In July 2010, at nearly 32 years of age, Zé Pedro returned to Vitória Setúbal after a six-year absence. He left at the end of the 2012–13 season, with the club always in the top flight; previously, in January 2013, Belenenses settled a €160.000 debt they had with him.

Coaching career
Zé Pedro started working as a manager immediately after retiring, with his last club Grupo Desportivo Alcochetense in the Setúbal regional leagues. Subsequently, he was part of his former Belenenses teammate Silas' coaching staff at C.F. Os Belenenses (later renamed Belenenses SAD) and Sporting CP.

References

External links

1978 births
Living people
People from Montijo, Portugal
Sportspeople from Setúbal District
Portuguese footballers
Association football midfielders
Primeira Liga players
Liga Portugal 2 players
Segunda Divisão players
C.D. Montijo players
F.C. Barreirense players
Boavista F.C. players
A.D. Ovarense players
Vitória F.C. players
C.F. Os Belenenses players
Portuguese football managers
Portuguese expatriate sportspeople in Cyprus